German submarine U-377 was a Type VIIC U-boat of Nazi Germany's Kriegsmarine during World War II. The submarine was laid down on 8 April 1940 at the Howaldtswerke yard in Kiel, launched on 15 August 1941, and commissioned on 2 October 1941 under the command of Kapitänleutnant Otto Köhler.

U-377 was attached to the 6th U-boat Flotilla, and was ready for front-line service from 1 February 1942. She served with the 11th U-boat Flotilla based in Norway from 1 July 1942, and was transferred to the 9th U-boat Flotilla based in France on 1 March 1943. She sailed on 11 war patrols between February 1942 and January 1944, but sank no ships, before she was sunk with the loss of all hands on 17 January 1944 on the position  by depth charges from the British destroyer  and the frigate .

Design
German Type VIIC submarines were preceded by the shorter Type VIIB submarines. U-377 had a displacement of  when at the surface and  while submerged. She had two shafts and two  propellers.

U-377 was fitted with five  torpedo tubes (four fitted at the bow and one at the stern), fourteen torpedoes, one  SK C/35 naval gun, 220 rounds, and a  C/30 anti-aircraft gun. The boat had a complement of between forty-four and sixty.

Service history

Norway
U-377 sailed from Kiel on 14 February 1942 and patrolled along the coast of Norway before arriving at Narvik on 28 February. This was her home port for the rest of the year, she sailed on a series of six patrols in the Barents Sea, without success.

On 30 January 1943 U-377 left Bergen and sailed out into the Atlantic, patrolling south of Greenland, before arriving at Brest in France on 18 March, having been transferred to the 9th U-boat Flotilla.

France
U-377 sailed from Brest on 15 April, out into the mid-Atlantic, and patrolled for 54 days, before returning to base on 7 June.

On 2 August 1943 her commander, Otto Köhler, left the boat and was replaced by Oberleutnant zur See Gerhard Kluth. Kluth's first patrol was quite eventful, as her first two attempts were cut short; U-377 sailed from Brest on 26 August 1943, but returned on the 30th; she sailed again on 6 September 1943, returning the next day. Finally she set out again on 9 September, joining other U-boats in mid-Atlantic. On 22 September, the U-boat was attacked by a B-24 Liberator, wounding the commander. The U-boat returned to port under the command of the I WO. Leutnant zur See Ernst-August Gerke.

Loss
U-377 departed from Brest on 15 December 1943, with Kluth back in command, sailing out into mid-Atlantic. She made her last radio report on 15 January 1944, claiming to have attacked an unidentified search group with homing torpedoes. The BdU ("U-boat Command") expected the U-boat to head back to France on or about 29 January, so when she had failed to arrive by 10 February, she was listed as missing from 4 February 1944. After the war the Allied Assessment Committee were unable to attribute the loss of U-377 to any known anti-submarine attack, and the U-boat was officially recorded as "lost to unknown cause". The Kriegsmarine had received at least two partially corrupted unsigned coded emergency messages around the time of the U-boat's disappearance, leading to a theory that U-377 had been sunk by one of its own Zaunkoenig T-5 acoustic torpedoes. This explanation has been generally accepted post-war.

Wolfpacks
U-377 took part in 15 wolfpacks, namely:
 Aufnahme (7 – 11 March 1942) 
 Blücher (11 – 18 March 1942) 
 Bums (6 – 14 April 1942) 
 Blutrausch (15 – 17 April 1942) 
 Trägertod (12 – 21 September 1942) 
 Ritter (11 – 21 February 1943) 
 Neptun (22 February – 2 March 1943) 
 Amsel (22 April – 3 May 1943) 
 Amsel 2 (3 – 6 May 1943) 
 Elbe (7 – 10 May 1943) 
 Elbe 2 (10 – 14 May 1943) 
 Leuthen (15 – 22 September 1943) 
 Borkum (24 December 1943 – 3 January 1944) 
 Borkum 3 (3 – 13 January 1944) 
 Rügen (13 – 17 January 1944)

References

Bibliography

External links

German Type VIIC submarines
U-boats commissioned in 1941
U-boats sunk in 1944
World War II submarines of Germany
1941 ships
Ships built in Kiel
U-boats sunk by depth charges
U-boats sunk by British warships
Ships lost with all hands
Maritime incidents in January 1944
World War II shipwrecks in the Atlantic Ocean